Parkes may refer to:

 Sir Henry Parkes (1815–1896), Australian politician, one of the earliest and most prominent advocates for Australian federation

Named for Henry Parkes
 Parkes, New South Wales, a regional town
 Parkes Observatory, a radio telescope near Parkes, New South Wales
 Parkes Shire, a local government area in New South Wales
 Parkes, Australian Capital Territory, a suburb of Canberra
 Division of Parkes (1901–1969), an abolished Sydney electorate in the Australian House of Representatives
 Division of Parkes, a current regional electorate in the House of Representatives
 Tenterfield School of Arts, known as the Sir Henry Parkes School of Arts
 HMAS Parkes, a Royal Australian Navy corvette during World War II

People
 Alexander Parkes (1813–1890), English inventor
 Broc Parkes (born 1981), Australian motorcycle racer
 Colin Murray Parkes (born 1928), British psychiatrist 
 Dave Parkes, Canadian sports administrator
 David Parkes (footballer, born 1950), Irish football player
 Ebenezer Parkes (1848–1919), English politician
 Edmund Alexander Parkes (1819–1876), English physician
 Edmundson Parkes (1904–1997), President and CEO of United Gas Corporation
 Sir Edward Parkes (born 1926), vice-chancellor of City University London (1974–1978)
 Ernie Parkes (1894–?), Canadian ice hockey player
 Fanny Parkes (1794–1875), Welsh travel writer
 Gerard Parkes, Irish-born Canadian actor 
 Gregory Parkes (b. 1964), American Catholic bishop
 Harry Parkes (diplomat) (1828–1885), British consul in China and Japan
 Harry Parkes (footballer, born 1920) (1920–2009), English footballer
 Harry Parkes (footballer, born 1888), (1888–1947), English footballer and manager
 Henry Bamford Parkes (1904–1972), English historian and author
 Howard Parkes (1877–1920), English cricketer
 James Parkes (priest) (1896–1981), historian and activist from the Channel Islands
 James Parkes (rugby union) (born 1980), English rugby union player
 James S. Parkes, American politician
 Jordan Parkes (born 1983), English footballer
 Joseph Parkes (1796–1865), English political reformer
 Kineton Parkes (1865–1938), English novelist, art historian and librarian
 Lauren Parkes (born 1987), American beauty pageant contestant
 Malcolm Parkes (1930 - 2013), English paleographer
 Michael Parkes (born 1944), American fantasy artist
 Mike Parkes (1931–1977), British racing driver 
 Nii Parkes (born 1974), British-born Ghanaian poet
 Phil Parkes (footballer, born 1947), English football goalkeeper (for Wolverhampton Wanderers)
 Phil Parkes (footballer, born 1950), English football goalkeeper (for Queens Park Rangers and West Ham United)
 Robin Parkes, Australian businessman
 Samuel Parkes (chemist) (c. 1759–1825), British chemist
 Samuel Parkes (VC) (1815–1864), British recipient of the Victoria Cross
 Shaun Parkes (born 1973), English actor
 Terence Parkes, UK cartoonist known as Larry
 Taylor Parkes (born 1972), British journalist
 Tony Parkes (born 1949), English professional footballer
 Walter F. Parkes, American screenwriter and producer

See also
 Parkes process, a pyrometallurgical industrial process
 Parks (surname)
 Parke (disambiguation)
 Park (disambiguation)

English-language surnames